Anbarak may refer to:
 Anbarak, Bushehr
 Anbarak, Hormozgan